This article contains information about the literary events and publications of 1704.

Events
July – The Storm: or, a collection of the most remarkable casualties and disasters which happen'd in the late dreadful tempest, both by sea and land, a documentary account by Daniel Defoe of the Great Storm of 1703 in England, is published in London by John Nutt.
December – John Churchill, 1st Duke of Marlborough, arrives back in Britain after his victory at the Battle of Blenheim. The English architect and dramatist Sir John Vanbrugh is commissioned by Queen Anne to begin Blenheim Palace.
unknown dates
A Tale of a Tub, the first major satire by Jonathan Swift (written 1694–1697), is published in London by John Nutt with The Battle of the Books as part of the prolegomena, running through three editions this year.
Antoine Galland publishes the first volume of Les mille et une nuits, the first translation of One Thousand and One Nights into a European language.

New books

Prose
Joseph Addison – The Campaign
Mary Astell – A Fair Way with Dissenters and their Patrons (reply to Defoe)
Willem Bosman – Nauwkeurige beschrijving van de Guinese Goud- Tand- en Slavekust (A new and accurate description of the coast of Guinea, divided into the Gold, the Slave, and the Ivory coasts)
William Chillingworth – The Works of William Chillingworth
Mary Davys – The Amours of Alcyippus and Leucippe
Daniel Defoe 
The Address
The Dissenters Answer to the High-Church Challenge
An Elegy on the Author of the True-Born English-man
An Essay on the Regulation of the Press (attrib.)
Giving Alms No Charity, and Employing the Poor a Grievance to the Nation
A Hymn to Victory
More Short-Ways with the Dissenters
A Review of the Affairs of France
The Storm
John Dennis – The Person of Quality's Answer to Mr Collier's Letter
"Dictionnaire de Trévoux" (Dictionnaire universel françois et latin)
Andrew Fletcher – An Account of a Conversation Concerning a Right Regulation of Governments for the Good of Mankind
Pierre Jurieu – Histoire critique des dogmes et des cultes
White Kennett – The Christian Scholar (attrib.)
Sarah Kemble Knight – The Journals of Madam Knight
Charles Leslie – The Wolf Stript of his Shepherd's Clothing (against Defoe'sShortest Way)
Paul Lucas – Voyage du Sieur Paul Lucas au Levant
Bernard de Mandeville – Typhon
Isaac Newton – Opticks
Mary Pix – Violenta
George Psalmanazar – An Historical and Geographical Description of Formosa (hoax)
Matthew Prior – A Letter to Monsieur Boileau Depreaux
Jonathan Swift 
A Tale of a Tub
The Battle of the Books

Drama
Thomas Baker – An Act at Oxford
Colley Cibber – The Careless Husband
 William Congreve, John Vanbrugh, William Walsh – Squire Trelooby
 David Crauford – Love At First Sight
John Dennis – Liberty Asserted
George Farquhar – The Stage Coach
Nicholas Rowe -The Biter
Richard Steele – The Lying Lover
William Taverner – The Faithful Bride of Granada
Joseph Trapp – Abra-Mule

Poetry
William Wycherley – Miscellany Poems
See also 1704 in poetry

Births
January 1 – Soame Jenyns, English poet and essayist (died 1787)
February 12 – Charles Pinot Duclos, French writer (died 1772)
April – Thomas Osborne, English publisher and bookseller (died 1767)
June 16 – Joseph Thurston, English poet (died 1732)
June 22 – John Taylor, English classicist (died 1766)
August 11 – James Miller, English playwright, poet and satirist (died 1744)
unknown dates
John Adams, American poet (died 1740)
Yuan Mei (袁枚), Chinese poet, diarist and gastronome (died 1797)

Deaths
January 15 – Henry Herringman, English bookseller and publisher (born 1628)
February 23 – Henry Noris, Italian church historian and theologian (born 1631)
April 12 – Jacques Bénigne Bossuet, French writer (born 1627)
June 18 – Tom Brown, English satirist (born 1662)
July 9 – Yan Ruoqu (閻若璩), Chinese scholar and polymath (born 1636)
July 24 – István Gyöngyösi, Hungarian poet (born 1620)
August 19 – Jane Leade, English visionary and Christian mystic writer (born 1624)
October 28
John Locke, English philosopher (born 1632)
Goodwin Wharton, English autobiographer and politician (born 1653)
December 11 – Roger L'Estrange, English Royalist pamphleteer (born 1616)
unknown date – Barbara Blaugdone, English Quaker autobiographer (born c. 1609)

References

 
Years of the 18th century in literature